Khash may refer to:

Khash (dish), South Caucasian dish
Khash Rod District, a district in Nimruz Province, Afghanistan
Khash, Nimruz, capital of Khash Rod District, Afghanistan
Khash District, a district in Badakhshan Province, Afghanistan
Khash County, a county in Iran
Khash, Iran, capital of Khash County